The 1991 European Cup final was a football match held at the Stadio San Nicola in Bari, Italy, on 29 May 1991, that saw Red Star Belgrade of Yugoslavia defeat Marseille of France in a penalty shoot-out. After normal time and extra time could not separate the two sides, the match was to be decided on penalty kicks. Manuel Amoros's miss for the French side proved crucial, as Red Star held their nerve to win their first and, as of 2022, only European Cup.

Teams

Road to the final

Pre-match
Red Star arrived in Italy unusually early, on Thursday, 23 May 1991, six full days ahead of the final. There they stayed in Il Melograno Hotel, an isolated accommodation on the town outskirts, and trained at the facilities of A.C. Monopoli. Due to a lot of interest from richer European clubs already being raised for the future services of young Red Star players, the club management tried to ensure its footballers were fully focused on the task at hand. The players were placed in semi-quarantine immediately upon arrival in Italy, which meant being separated from wives and girlfriends without the ability to receive incoming phone calls in hotel rooms, though able to make outgoing calls.

Over the coming days, the club also organized for a large entourage consisting of former players and coaches, friends of the club, etc. to arrive in Bari in order to watch Red Star in its first European Cup final. Therefore, club legends Rajko Mitić and Dragoslav Šekularac, notable former players Srđan Mrkušić, Stanislav Karasi, Živorad Jevtić, club's former coach Miša Pavić along with Serbian celebrities and public personalities such as Ljuba Tadić, Ivan Bekjarev, Bora Đorđević, etc. made their way to Italy.

Match

Details

See also
1990–91 European Cup
Olympique de Marseille in European football
Red Star Belgrade in European football

Notes

References

External links
1990–91 season at UEFA website 
1991 European Cup Final at European Cup History

1
European Cup Final 1991
European Cup Final 1991
European Cup Final 1991
1991
European Cup Final 1991
European Cup Final
Sport in Bari